Frédéric Mémin (born October 13, 1979, in Poitiers, France) is a retired professional footballer. He played as a midfielder.

Mémin made 9 appearances in Ligue 2 with Niort.

See also
Football in France
List of football clubs in France

References

External links
Frédéric Mémin profile at chamoisfc79.fr

1979 births
Living people
French footballers
Association football midfielders
AJ Auxerre players
Chamois Niortais F.C. players
Ligue 2 players
SO Châtellerault players
Stade Poitevin FC players